Edward Leslie Grant (May 21, 1883 – October 5, 1918), was an American professional baseball player. He played in Major League Baseball as a third baseman between 1905 and 1915. Grant became one of the few major league players who were killed in World War I.

Biography

Grant was born on May 21, 1883, in Franklin, Massachusetts. After completing high school in 1901, Grant attended Dean Academy (now Dean College) in Franklin for a year before enrolling at Harvard University (earning him the nickname "Harvard Eddie"). While at Harvard, Grant was a member of the freshman basketball and baseball teams. He played varsity basketball for the Crimson during his sophomore year in 1903, and was set to play varsity baseball the following spring until he was declared ineligible for playing in a professional independent baseball league the previous summer. He graduated from Harvard University with an undergraduate degree in 1905 and a law degree in 1909.

Grant entered the majors with the Cleveland Naps at the very end of the  season as an emergency replacement for an ailing Nap Lajoie. Grant batted leadoff for the Phillies, but was known more for his fielding and base stealing than his bat.

Grant was traded again to the New York Giants in the middle of the  season, where he finished his career as a utility infielder. Grant appeared in two games of the 1913 World Series, once as a pinch runner and once as a pinch hitter. He retired after the  season. His lifetime batting average was .249.

Perhaps because of his Harvard background, Grant refused to call for a fly ball by yelling, "I got it!" Instead, he would only say what he regarded as the more grammatically correct, "I have it!"

Post-career

Upon his retirement from baseball, Grant opened a law practice in Boston.

Grant was one of the first men to enlist when the United States entered World War I in April 1917, and he served as a captain in the 77th Division. During the fierce battle of the Meuse–Argonne offensive, all of Grant's superior officers were killed or wounded, and he took command of his troops on a four-day search for the "Lost Battalion."  During the search, an exploding shell killed Grant on October 5, 1918. He was the first Major League Baseball player killed in action in World War I. He was buried at the Meuse-Argonne American Cemetery in Lorraine, France.

Grant was one of eight Major League Baseball players known either to have been killed or died from illness while serving in the armed forces during World War I.  The others were Alex Burr‚ Harry Chapman, Larry Chappell‚ Harry Glenn‚ Newt Halliday, Ralph Sharman and Bun Troy.

Legacy
On Memorial Day, May 30, 1921, representatives from the armed forces, baseball, and the sisters of Grant unveiled a monument in center field of the Polo Grounds to his memory. It was missing for over 40 years until it was claimed to be re-discovered in a Ho-Ho-Kus, New Jersey home that had been owned by a New York City police officer. However, the photo shown of the supposed plaque on the Internet does not look like the missing plaque from the Polo Grounds, which has now been replicated at the San Francisco Giants current ballpark as of 2006.

Grant is also memorialized with the Edward L. Grant Highway in The Bronx, New York and by Grant Field at Dean College.

See also

 List of Major League Baseball career stolen bases leaders

References

External links

 , or Flickr, or Retrosheet, or SABR Biography Project, or The Baseball Almanac, or The Baseball Cube, or The DeadBall Era

1883 births
1918 deaths
American men's basketball players
American military personnel killed in World War I
Baseball players from Massachusetts
Burials at Meuse-Argonne American Cemetery
Cincinnati Reds players
Cleveland Naps players
Harvard Crimson men's basketball players
Harvard Law School alumni
Jersey City Skeeters players
Major League Baseball third basemen
Montpelier-Barre players
New York Giants (NL) players
People from Franklin, Massachusetts
Philadelphia Phillies players
United States Army officers
United States Army personnel of World War I
Military personnel from Massachusetts